Eugenia linocieroidea is a species of plant in the family Myrtaceae. It is found in Malaysia and Singapore. It is threatened by habitat loss.

References

linocieroidea
Near threatened plants
Trees of Malaya
Taxonomy articles created by Polbot
Taxobox binomials not recognized by IUCN